ŽKK Zadar is Croatian Women's basketball club in Zadar. The headquarters is in Zadar.

External links
Profile at eurobasket.com

Women's basketball teams in Croatia
Sport in Zadar
Women's basketball teams in Yugoslavia